Rattanin Leenutaphong (born 24 April 1990) is a Thai racing driver currently competing in the TCR International Series and TCR Thailand Touring Car Championship. Having previously competed in the Thailand Super Series - Super Eco Class.

Racing career
Leenutaphong began his career in 2015 in the Thailand Super Series' Super Eco class. In 2016 he switched to the TCR Thailand Touring Car Championship, he finished the season third in the Am standings that year, after only taking part in one race weekend. He stayed in the series for 2017, this time entering the series full time. Again driving a SEAT León TCR for Yontrakit Racing Team.

In August 2017 it was announced that he would race in the TCR International Series, driving an SEAT León TCR for his TCR Thailand team Yontrakit Racing Team.

Racing record

Complete TCR International Series results
(key) (Races in bold indicate pole position) (Races in italics indicate fastest lap)

† Driver did not finish the race, but was classified as he completed over 90% of the race distance.
* Season still in progress.

References

External links
 

1990 births
Living people
TCR International Series drivers
Rattanin Leenutaphong
TCR Asia Series drivers
Rattanin Leenutaphong